Rico Rex (born 5 October 1976 in Chemnitz) is a German former pair skater. With former partner Eva-Maria Fitze, he is the 2003 German national champion.

Career 
Rico Rex started figure skating when he was four years old as the result of a talent screening in East Germany.

Rex was a single skater until 1993. He then switched to pair skating and teamed up with Silvia Dimitrov, with whom he competed until 1997. They were coached by Monika Scheibe in Chemnitz. Their best international result was 8th at the 1996 European Championships. Dimitrov retired in 1997 due to an injury.

Rex then teamed up with Katharina Rybkowski with whom he skated until 2000. Their coach in Chemnitz was Monika Scheibe. The pair never participated at Europeans or Worlds. He then briefly teamed up with Stefanie Weiss, but they did not compete together. In 2001, Rex teamed up with the Czech Radka Zlatohlavkova. They split after having to withdraw from the 2002 German Championships.

Rex teamed up with Eva-Maria Fitze in spring 2002. The pair trained in Chemnitz. Their coach was Ingo Steuer until December 2005, and then Monika Scheibe. The pair competed at the 2006 Winter Olympics, placing 15th. Rex then left competition and began appearing in shows and began working as a figure skating coach in Dresden.

Throughout his career, Rex represented the club Chemnitzer EC.

Programs 
(with Fitze)

Competitive highlights

With Fitze

With Zlatohlavkova

With Rybkowski

With Dimitrov

Single skating

References

External links

 

1976 births
Living people
German male pair skaters
Figure skaters at the 2006 Winter Olympics
Olympic figure skaters of Germany
Sportspeople from Chemnitz